The Banff Hockey Academy Bears were a Junior "B" Ice Hockey team based in Banff, Alberta, Canada. They are members of the South Division of the Heritage Junior B Hockey League (HJHL) as well as members of the Canadian Sport School Hockey League (CSSHL). They play their home games at Banff Recreation Centre.

The franchise elected not to participate in the 2017-18 Heritage Junior B Hockey League season.

Season-by-season record

Note: GP = Games played, W = Wins, L = Losses, T = Ties, OTL = Overtime Losses, Pts = Points, GF = Goals for, GA = Goals against, PIM = Penalties in minutes

NHL alumni  
Matt Keith

See also
List of ice hockey teams in Alberta

External links
Official website of the Banff Academy Bears

Ice hockey teams in Alberta
Banff, Alberta
1994 establishments in Alberta